Evergreen Secondary School (EVGSS) is a co-educational government secondary school in Woodlands, Singapore. Founded in 2000, the integrated government school offers secondary education under SBB that offers 3 bands, which lead up to the Singapore-Cambridge GCE Ordinary Level or the Singapore-Cambridge GCE Normal Level examination. Students and teachers of the school are referred to as 'EVGians'. Media produced by the school is also uploaded on the YouTube channel, Facebook and Instagram

History 

EVGSS was founded on 3 January 2000 in Woodlands New Town.EVGSS moved into their newly-built compound in June the same year.

Before EVG built their compound, they had lessons at Woodgrove Secondary (holding ground).  

EVGSS held their 20th anniversary onwards by awarding students with an anniversary polo t-shirt which is coloured in red. This shirt would be used for special events such as National Day and Chinese New Year. EVGians can also wear the t-shirt during curriculum. The current 2 anniversary t-shirts are the 20th and 21st anniversary t-shirts especially given to students in EVGSS. 

On 4 February 2010, EVGSS held their 10th anniversary performance, 'Metamorphosis' at Republic Polytechnic's cultural centre, with Lim Wee Kiak, Member of Parliament for Sembawang GRC, as the guest-of-honour.

On 8th August 2022, EVGSS held their 21st Anniversary Musical ‘Coming of Age’, delayed by the COVID-19 pandemic.

Principal

Academics 
Being a government secondary school, EVGSS offers three academic streams, namely the four-year Express course, as well as the Normal Course, comprising Normal (Academic) and Normal (Technical) academic tracks. However, by the new SBB programme, students under different courses may be opted to take subjects at a higher level.

O Level Express Course 
The Express Course is a nationwide four-year programme that leads up to the Singapore-Cambridge GCE Ordinary Level examination.

Normal Course 
The Normal Course is a nationwide 4-year programme leading to the Singapore-Cambridge GCE Normal Level examination, which runs either the Normal (Academic) [N(A)] or Normal (Technical) [N(T)] curriculum.

Normal (Academic) Course 
In the Normal (Academic) course, students offer 5–8 subjects in the Singapore-Cambridge GCE Normal Level examination. Compulsory subjects include:
 English Language
 Mother Tongue Language
 Mathematics
 Combined Humanities
A 5th year leading to the Singapore-Cambridge GCE Ordinary Level examination is available to N(A) students who perform well in their Singapore-Cambridge GCE Normal Level examination. Students can move from one course to another based on their performance and the assessment of the school principal and teachers.

Normal (Technical) Course 
The Normal (Technical) course prepares students for a technical-vocational education at the Institute of Technical Education. Students will offer 5–7 subjects in the Singapore-Cambridge GCE Normal Level examination. The curriculum is tailored towards strengthening students’ proficiency in English and Mathematics. Students take English Language, Mathematics, Basic Mother Tongue and Computer Applications as compulsory subjects.

Notable alumni 

 Carrie Wong, actress

References

External links 
 Official website

Secondary schools in Singapore
Woodlands, Singapore
Educational institutions established in 2000
2000 establishments in Singapore